Giorgi Revazishvili may refer to:

 Giorgi Revazishvili (judoka) (born 1974), Georgian judoka
 Giorgi Revazishvili (footballer) (born 1977), retired Georgian football player